Hamari Wali Good News is an Indian Hindi television series that aired from 20 October 2020 to 14 August 2021 on Zee TV. It stars Juhi Parmar, Shakti Anand, Subir Rana, Raghav Tiwari and Srishti Jain. It is produced by Bodhi Tree Multimedia of Mautik Tolia and Sukesh Motwani. The Serial went Off Air On 14 August 2021. It was later replaced by Meet: Badlegi Duniya Ki Reet in its timeslot.

Plot 

Set in Agra, Renuka Tiwari and Mukund Tiwari eagerly wait for their grandchildren but were devastated to learn that Navya their daughter-in-law can't conceive due to tubal occlusion. Mukund's step-sister diehard wants Good News from Navya and Aditya so she forces and badmouths Renuka. Also, Mukund berates her for every attempt.

Devastated by the news her daughter-in-law can't conceive, Renuka tried many things to bring the much-awaited Good News in the family but all her efforts went in vain. Later events show a way to Renuka, she decides to bring Good News in the family herself along with her husband Mukund Tiwari. Mukund's step-sister, on the other hand, tries to create differences between Renuka and Mukund & she was successful in separating the two, Mukund did Sharadh of Renuka & decided to divorce her & then the much-awaited Good News came that Renuka is pregnant. Mukund brings Renuka back home, he initially was hesitant & shocked but later take the full responsibility of the child. Mukund's sister continues to hatch various plans along with Alok Dubey(Tiwari's Son-in-law) to create misunderstandings between Renuka & Mukund & create havoc in Tiwari House. Renuka decides to expose Mukund's step sister and to bring her reality in front of Mukund. With various efforts it is revealed that Mukund's real sister is alive. And its Sumitra who killed Mukund's mother for property.

Mukund supports Renuka and abandons Sumitra. Meanwhile, Adi turns negative and plots with Sumitra and Alok to gain property. As Mukund and Renuka go away from Agra, Adi betrays Navya and is head over heels with Aki, with whom he turned the Tiwari house into bar. Later Sumitra tricks Renuka that she has changed yet Mukund is suspicious.
The trio returns to Agra and is devastated to find about Adi. Sumitra uses this opportunity and makes Adi and Aki her ally with Alok.

The baby is born and it is named as Barath. Mukund transfers all the property to Barath. In order to gain property Adi and his team plot and kidnap Navya and Barath. Later Renuka is also kidnapped and all the three are kept in garage.
In order to escape Navya informs everything to Mukund via video call. As Adi finds about Navya's escape plan he burns the whole garage. Navya, Barath and Adi escape and Renuka dies.
To escape from the clutches of evil Navya,Mukund along with Barath go to Delhi.

One month later 
In Delhi, Navya owns Barath health centre, where she runs juice shop. Ritwik Parmar, a wealthy businessman enters her life. Mukund still believes that Renuka is alive. Meera(Renuka's look-alike), Ritwik's aunt and Ritwik help Navya and Mukund to get rid of Adi and his team. The media mistakes Navya and Ritwik to be in love and spreads fake news,!which outrageous Devika Ritwik's mother. So she is in a fix to search alliance for Ritwik. Meanwhile, Mukund realises Meera is not his Renuka and accepts Renuka is dead. Soon, Ritwik and Navya fall in love and get married to each other. Also, Mukund gets married to Meera. Adi enters into their lives again when he traps Ritwik's sister in love. Adi starts to live with the family.

Cast 

 Juhi Parmar as 
 Renuka Tiwari – Mukund's late wife; Aditya, Preeti and Bharat's mother (Dead)
 Meera Parmar Tiwari – Renuka's lookalike; Devika's sister; Mukund's second wife; Aditya, Preeti and Bharat's step-mother 
 Shakti Anand as Mukund Tiwari – Sumitra's step-brother; Renuka's widower; Meera's husband; Aditya, Preeti and Bharat's father 
 Srishti Jain as Navya Agnihotri Parmar – Poonam's daughter; Aditya's ex-wife; Ritwik's wife
 Shabaaz Abdullah Badi as Alok Dubey – Preeti's husband : Renuka and Mukund's Son In Law
 Farah Lakhani as Preeti Tiwari Dubey – Renuka and Mukund's daughter; Aditya and Bharat's sister; Alok's wife
 Raghav Tiwari as Aditya Tiwari – Renuka and Mukund's elder son; Preeti and Bharat's brother; Navya's ex-husband; Akanksha's husband
 Subir Rana as Ritwik Parmar – Devika's son; Akanksha's brother; Navya's second husband
 Kinjal Pandya as Akanksha "Akki" Parmar Tiwari – Devika's daughter; Ritwik's sister; Aditya's second wife
 Bindiya Kalra as Devika Parmar – Meera's sister; Ritwik and Akanksha's mother
 Shweta Gautam as Advocate Poonam Agnihotri – Navya's mother
 Kiran Sharma as Sumitra Mishra – Mukund's step-sister
 Samiksha Bhatnagar as Vrinda
 Manish Goel as Dr. Raghav Sharma 
 Arpana Agarwal as Kusum
 Vaishnavi Ganatra as Aanchal Mishra
 Jyoti Tiwari as Indu Mishra
 Anushka Srivastav as Madhu
 Rahul Dwivedi as Ashraf
 Nidhi Mathur as Shilpa
 Jatin Shah as Alok

References

External links 
 
 Hamari Wali Good News on Zee5

2020 Indian television series debuts
Hindi-language television shows
Indian drama television series
Indian television soap operas